Chamaecostus is a group of plants in the  Costaceae described as a genus in 2006. It is  endemic to South America.

 Species
 Chamaecostus congestiflorus - Venezuela, N Brazil, Guyana, Suriname, French Guiana
 Chamaecostus curcumoides - French Guiana
 Chamaecostus cuspidatus - E Brazil
 Chamaecostus fragilis - Colombia, N Brazil
 Chamaecostus fusiformis - Pará
 Chamaecostus lanceolatus - Colombia, Venezuela, Brazil, Guyana, Suriname, French Guiana
 Chamaecostus subsessilis - Brazil, Bolivia

References

Costaceae
Zingiberales genera